Chhiplakot or Najurikot, which in local language is called Chhipuldhura, is a Himalayan mountain range that lies between the Kali River and Gori River in Pithoragarh district of Uttarakhand, India.  It is bounded on the east by Nepal, on the west by Munsyari and on the north by the Himalayas, on the south by the Askot.  This mountain is situated to the south of Panchachuli. The highest peak of this range is Najurikot, which is about 4497 meters above sea level. It has beautiful places full of wide range of flora and fauna, lakes and beautiful alpine meadows.

Parent range    kumaun Himalaya

Highest peak    Najurikot

Elevation           4497

Location  Dharchula Pithoragarh

Native name   Chhipuldhura

Coordination   29.9591532, 80.4282521

Etymology

The name of this mountain in local or Kumaoni language is Chhipuldhura which is made up of two words Chhipla and Dhura.  Chhipla Kedar is a folk deity whose area is between the river Kali and Gori Ganga and dhura means mountain or, say, high place.  Hence Chhipuldhura or Chhiplakot means the place or abode of the lord Chhipla Kedar.  Therefore, this area was named Chhiplakot as it was the stronghold or coat of the god Kedar.  This area is very sacred and religious for the people of Kumaon.  The remains of an old fort still exist on the top of the mountain.

Lakes      
There are many other kunds in Chhiplakot besides this.

References
coordination 29.9591532, 80.4282521
c

 Geography of Pithoragarh district